Ancistrus malacops is a species of catfish in the family Loricariidae. It is a freshwater fish native to South America, where it occurs in the Ampiyacu River basin in Peru. FishBase states that the species reaches 7.7 cm (3 inches) SL, although larger specimens, including one of 11.78 cm (4.6 inches) SL from the Gustavo Orcés V. Natural History Museum in Quito, Ecuador, are known.

References 

malacops
Fish described in 1872